State Route 389, also known as SR 389, is a state highway in far northern Arizona serving the Arizona Strip.  SR 389 stretches from the Utah border at Colorado City, southeast to Pipe Spring National Monument, and ends at U.S. Route 89A in Fredonia; it is the only major east–west route between these two towns, and also serves to connect Fredonia with points farther west such as St. George, Utah.

Route description
SR 389 is a  highway located in the Arizona Strip that connects the two cities of Colorado City and Fredonia.  The western terminus of the highway is located at the Utah border in Colorado City where the highway continues into Utah as State Route 59.  SR 389 heads southeast from the border intersecting several county routes along its routing.  The highway takes a more easterly course as it enters the Kaibab Indian Reservation.  Within the reservation, the highway passes near the Pipe Spring National Monument.  Once it passes the monument, the highway begins to head towards the northeast towards Fredonia.  It leaves the Kaibab Indian Reservation and enters the city of Fredonia before reaching its eastern terminus at US 89A.

History
SR 389 was established in 1959 along its current route.

Junction list

References

External links

SR 389 at Arizona Roads

389
Transportation in Mohave County, Arizona
Transportation in Coconino County, Arizona